Baidu Knows is a Chinese language collaborative web-based collective intelligence by question and answer provided by the Chinese search engine Baidu. Like Baidu itself, the knows is heavily self-censored in line with government regulations.

The test version was launched on June 21, 2005, and turned into release version on November 8, 2005.

Introduction
A registered user(member for short) puts a question (should be specific) and motivates other members to supply answers using credits as an award. Meanwhile, these answers turn to search result of the same or relevant questions. That's how knowledge is accumulated and shared.

Question and answer together with search engine makes it possible for a member to be a producer and consumer of knowledge, which is the so-called collective intelligence.

Knows's Principle
Questions or answers containing the following types of content are removed:
Pornographic, violent, horrible and uncivilized content
 Advertisement
 Reactionary content
 Personal attacks
 Content against morality and ethics
 Malicious, trivial or spam-like content

References

External links
 Baidu Zhidao 

Baidu
Question-and-answer websites